Manus McGuire is an Irish fiddle player.

Early life 
He was born in Tullamore, and grew up in County Sligo. He resides in County Clare. In 1970, he won Sligo's prestigious Fiddler of Dooney competition, at age 14.

Career 
He is a founding member (with older brother Seamus, Jackie Daly and Garry O'Briain) of "Buttons & Bows", "Moving Cloud" (with Paul Brock, Maeve Donnelly, Kevin Crawford and Carl Hession), and The Brock McGuire Band (with Paul Brock, Enda Scahill and Denis Carey; Fergal Scahill and Dennis Morrison also played with the band).  Both brothers were medical doctors; Seamus lives in Donegal.

Manus performs mainly as a solo artist, and with Canadian singer/songwriter Emily Flack.

Discography
 The Humours of Lissadell (with Seamus McGuire, Folk Legacy, 1980)
 Carousel  (with Seamus McGuire & Daithi Sproule, Gael Linn, 1984)
 Buttons & Bows (by Buttons & Bows, Green Linnet, 1984)
 The First Month of Summer (by Buttons & Bows, Green Linnet, 1987)
 Grace Notes (by Buttons & Bows, Gael Linn, 1991)
 Moving Cloud (by Moving Cloud, Green Linnet, 1995)
 Foxglove (by Moving Cloud, Green Linnet, 1998)
 Saffron & Blue (Green Linnet, 2000)
 Brock McGuire Band (Ferndale, 2004)
 Fiddlewings (2006)
 Green Grass Blue Grass (with Ricky Skaggs et al, 2011)
 The Return of Spring (by Buttons & Bows, own label, 2015)

References

Irish fiddlers
Musicians from County Sligo
Living people
20th-century violinists
21st-century violinists
Year of birth missing (living people)
Green Linnet Records artists